Kamera Obskura is a 2012 Filipino drama film produced and directed by Raymond Red.  It was co-written by Red and Pen Medina, who stars as the protagonist of a fictional lost film recovered by film archivists.

Plot 
Film archivists uncover a lost Filipino black-and-white silent film about an escaped convict who uses a magic camera to help the people of a small town.  After showing the 70-minute film, the archivists debate its significance and the best way to preserve Filipino cinema.

Cast 
 Pen Medina as Juan, star of the lost silent film
 Joel Torre
 Nanding Josef
 Abe Pagtama
 Suzette Ranillo
 Ping Medina
 Irene Gabriel
 Lou Veloso
 Bert Habal
 Archie Adamos
 Madlen Nicolas
 Teddy Co
 Cesar Hernando
 Ricky Orellana

Production 
Red was influenced by Metropolis and Zelig.  Red says that he had not seen The Artist prior to filming.

Release 
Kamera Obskura premiered at the 8th Cinemalaya Independent Film Festival on July 21, 2012.

Reception 
Richard Kuipers of Variety wrote that Red "succeeds marvelously in conceptual and visual terms, but his soundtrack strategy is likely to sharply divide audiences".  Oggs Cruz of Twitch Film criticized both the score and the fictional film-within-a-film but called the concept "utterly brilliant".

Kamera Obskura won Best Original Music Score, Best Direction, and Special Jury Prize at Cinemalaya.

References

External links 
 
 

2012 films
Philippine drama films
2010s English-language films
2010s Tagalog-language films
Fictional films
2012 drama films
2012 multilingual films
Philippine multilingual films